Tähtvere Parish was a rural municipality in Tartu County, Estonia. In 2017, it was merged into Tartu City municipality.

Settlements
Small boroughs
Ilmatsalu - Märja
Villages
Haage - Ilmatsalu - Kandiküla - Kardla - Pihva - Rahinge - Rõhu - Tähtvere - Tüki - Vorbuse

Twinnings
 Joutsa, Finland

References

External links